Count On the Saint is a collection of two mystery novellas by Graham Weaver and Donne Avenell, continuing the adventures of the sleuth Simon Templar a.k.a. "The Saint", created by Leslie Charteris. Charteris served in an editorial capacity and received front-page author credit.

This book was first published in the United States in 1980 by The Crime Club, followed by a British edition by Hodder and Stoughton the same year.

This is the final collection of Saint novellas to be published to date; the final few volumes were full novels.

Stories
The book consisted of the following stories:

The Pastor's Problem
The Unsaintly Santa

1980 books
Simon Templar books
American novellas
The Crime Club books